Mick Smyth (born 13 May 1940) was an Irish soccer player who played for Drumcondra, Shamrock Rovers, Bohemians and Athlone Town in the League of Ireland throughout the 1960s, 1970s and 1980s and had a short spell in England with Barrow in the early 1960s.

He made his Rovers debut at Drogheda on 27 December 1964 and kept a clean sheet. A dominant goalkeeper, he won five FAI Cup winners medals in a row with Rovers from 1965 to 1969. After making 12 appearances in European competition for the Milltown club he left to join Bohemians in May 1971. He won two league winners medals in 1974/75 and 1977/78 and was named Irish Football Personality of the Year in 1977. He made 16 appearances in European competition for Bohs. Played in 136 competitive games in a row for Bohs between December 1973 until the April 1979.

Along with Johnny Fullam he signed for Athlone in August 1979. He signed back for Rovers in August 1982. He earned one cap for Ireland in 1968 against Poland. On 25 November 2008 his medals were stolen.

Honours
League of Ireland: 3
 Bohemians - 1974–75, 1977–78
 Athlone Town - 1980/81
FAI Cup: 6
 Shamrock Rovers - 1965, 1966, 1967, 1968, 1969
 Bohemians - 1976
League of Ireland Cup:3
 Bohemians - 1975
 Athlone Town - 1979/80, 1981/82
Leinster Senior Cup (association football):1
 Athlone Town - 1979/80
  Top Four Cup
 Shamrock Rovers 1966
  Dublin City Cup
 Shamrock Rovers 1966/67
Blaxnit Cup
Shamrock Rovers 1967-68
SWAI Personality of the Year
 Bohemians - 1976/77

Sources 

 The Hoops by Paul Doolan and Robert Goggins

Republic of Ireland association footballers
League of Ireland players
Shamrock Rovers F.C. players
Association football goalkeepers
Bohemian F.C. players
Athlone Town A.F.C. players
Barrow A.F.C. players
Republic of Ireland international footballers
United Soccer Association players
Boston Rovers players
1940 births
Living people
League of Ireland XI players
Drumcondra F.C. players